Mežciems Station is a railway station on the Riga – Daugavpils Railway on the outskirts of Daugavpils. Since 2011, passenger trains don't stop at the station.

References 

Railway stations in Latvia
Daugavpils
Railway stations opened in 1938
Latgale